Rodrigo Ángel Gil Torres (born 25 April 1985 in Cehegín, Murcia), known as Rodri, is a Spanish footballer who plays for Orihuela CF as a midfielder.

Club statistics

References

External links

1985 births
Living people
Spanish footballers
Footballers from the Region of Murcia
Association football midfielders
Segunda División players
Segunda División B players
Tercera División players
Real Murcia Imperial players
Real Murcia players
Real Madrid C footballers
Real Madrid Castilla footballers
Elche CF players
Orihuela CF players
RSD Alcalá players
UCAM Murcia CF players
Burgos CF footballers
Cypriot First Division players
Doxa Katokopias FC players
AC Omonia players
Spanish expatriate footballers
Expatriate footballers in Cyprus
Spanish expatriate sportspeople in Cyprus